He This Way, She That Way (German: Er rechts, sie links) is a 1915 German silent comedy film directed by Robert Wiene and starring Max Zilzer, Bogia Horska, Otto Treptow and Manny Ziener.

Plot 
A doctor and his wife try to resolve their marital problems by having affairs.

Cast 
 Max Zilzer – Herr Blümchen
 Manny Ziener – Frau Brandeis
 Bogia Horska – Amanda Karola
 Otto Treptow – Dr. Brandeis

References

Bibliography 
 Jung, Uli & Schatzberg, Walter. Beyond Caligari: The Films of Robert Wiene. Berghahn Books, 1999.

External links 

1915 films
Films of the German Empire
German silent short films
German comedy films
Films directed by Robert Wiene
German black-and-white films
1915 comedy films
Silent comedy films
1910s German films